The 2023 Maryland Terrapins football team will represent the University of Maryland in the East Division of the Big Ten Conference during the 2023 NCAA Division I FBS football season. The Terrapins are expected to be led by Mike Locksley in his fifth year as head coach. They will play their home games at SECU Stadium in College Park, Maryland.

Previous season 

The Terrapins finished the 2022 season with a record of 8-5 (4-5 in the Big Ten), fourth place in the Big Ten's East Division, and as Duke's Mayo Bowl champions. They won six of their first eight games, then lost three in a row before winning their final two games. Maryland fell to rival Penn State in November. The Terrapins finished 7–2 against unranked teams and 1-3 against ranked teams.

Offseason

Coaching staff changes 

Offensive coordinator Dan Enos departed to become the offensive coordinator for Arkansas.

Co-offensive coordinator Mike Miller departed to become the offensive coordinator for Charlotte.

In February, Kevin Sumlin was hired to become the associate head coach, co-offensive coordinator, and tight ends coach.

In March, Josh Gattis was hired to become the offensive coordinator.

Recruiting class

Outgoing transfers 
16 players elected to enter the NCAA transfer portal during or after the 2022 season.

Incoming transfers 

The Terrapins added nine players from the NCAA transfer portal.

NFL Draft
 
11 players declared for the 2023 NFL Draft.

Schedule

Roster

References

Maryland
Maryland Terrapins football seasons
Maryland Terrapins football